Gorice may refer to:

 Gorice, Sanski Most, a village in Bosnia
 Gorice, Brčko, a village in Bosnia
 Gorice, Brod-Posavina County, a village near Dragalić, Croatia
 Gorice, Šibenik-Knin County, a village near Skradin, Croatia
 Dolgovaške Gorice, a village in Slovenia
 Lendavske Gorice, a village in Slovenia
 Notranje Gorice, a village in Slovenia
 Vnanje Gorice, a village in Slovenia
 Vukomeričke gorice, a mountain in Croatia

See also
 Görice
 Goricë
 Goriče (disambiguation)
 Gorica (disambiguation)